The 2016 WPA World Nine-ball Junior Championship was a professional youth 9-Ball World championship held between 16–20 November 2016. The event was won by Zheng Xiaohuai in the Under 17 with a 8–5 final victory against Enkhbold Temuujin. In the age group Under 19, two former Under 17 World Champions met in Kong Dejing and Daniel Maciol the final. Kong won the match and the title 11–2. In the girls event, Chen Chia-hua met compatriot Tsai Pei-chun in the final, winning 9–8.

Winners

Tournament format 
All three competitions were first held in the Double-elimination tournament with a Single-elimination tournament from the quarter finals onwards. The events were all played as winner breaks.

Results

Under 17 boys

Under 19 boys

Girls

References

External links 

 

2016 in cue sports
2016 in Chinese sport
WPA World Nine-ball Junior Championship